was a city in Saitama Prefecture, Japan.

, the city had an estimated population of 54,486 and a population density of approximately 8,000 persons per km². The total area was 6.81 km².

History
The city was founded on April 10, 1972.

On October 1, 2005, Kamifukuoka, along with the town of Ōi (from Iruma District), was merged to create the city of Fujimino.

See also
 Kami-Fukuoka Station

External links
 

Dissolved municipalities of Saitama Prefecture
Fujimino, Saitama